SAAB Quantum was a series of five privately designed and built automobiles using various Saab components. The earliest used Saab 93 two-stroke engines, transmissions and suspension. The later used Saab 96 drivetrains and suspension parts.  All were built in the United States. 

The Quantum I was built in 1959, with a chassis computer engineered by Walter Kern at IBM in his spare time. It wore only the most basic bodywork at first. After initial testing and a race or two, it was replaced with moderately more complete bodywork which it still wears to this day. The Quantum II was nearly identical in every way, though built later. Both Quantums I and II were raced in the SCCA H-Modified class. They were pure prototypes and racing cars, never intended for production.

The Quantum III was designed to be a production car and was first presented in 1962. Only a few copies were built. Due to a lack of quality it was turned down by Saab in Sweden and never went into production.

 Quantum I (1959) - 1st iteration was with a very basic aluminum body. Second iteration of the bodywork was only slightly more finished. This is the version it wears today.
 Quantum II - Nearly identical to the Quantum I in every way. Both use a water-cooled, three-cylinder Saab two-stroke engine.
 Quantum III - Completely new design. Two built.
 Quantum IV (1963) - Single seater formula car sold as a kit car. Intended for Sports Car Club of America's (SCCA) "Formula S" series.
 Quantum V (1965) - Ginetta body. Saab two-stroke engine and transmission. One built.

External links

 New England Saab Association: The Quantum Series
 Formula S register
 George Vapaa's Quantum Formula S restoration scrapbook
 A Quantum IV restoration website
 La prima Saab Quantum I

Pictures
 Quantum III,
 Walter Kern (right)
 1959 Quantum I

Quantum
Rear-wheel-drive vehicles
Front-wheel-drive sports cars